Betty Eileen King is an American diplomat born in Saint Vincent, West Indies. From 2010 to 2013 she served as  the Representative of the United States to the European Office of the United Nations in Geneva, Switzerland.

Education
King received a Bachelor of Arts from the University of Windsor in Ontario, Canada. Later, she received a master's degree from Stony Brook University.

Diplomatic posting
King was confirmed as Permanent Representative (with the rank of Ambassador) to the UN in Geneva by the United States Senate on February 12, 2010 and was sworn in on February 18. She arrived in Geneva in March 2010, thirteen months after the last ambassador left. She had served in that post until late 2013.

References

External links

Betty E. King biography, U.S. Department of State

Academics from Washington, D.C.
African-American academics
African-American diplomats
Living people
Permanent Representatives of the United States to the United Nations
People from Saint Vincent (Antilles)
Saint Vincent and the Grenadines emigrants to the United States
Stony Brook University alumni
University of Windsor alumni
American women ambassadors
Ambassadors of the United States
1944 births
21st-century African-American people
21st-century African-American women
20th-century African-American people
20th-century African-American women